Witold Sobociński (15 October 1929 – 19 November 2018) was a Polish cinematographer, academic teacher as well as former jazz musician. Sobociński was a graduate of the renowned National Film School in Łódź. While in college, he was a member of the pioneer jazz band Melomani, in which he played the drums.

After graduation, he worked with Polish Television and Film Studios Czolowka, as a cameraman. In 1967 he debuted as a cinematographer. Sobociński cooperated with several notable directors, including Andrzej Wajda, Krzysztof Zanussi and Roman Polanski. He was a lecturer at the film school in Łódź from 1980 until his death in 2018. He was known for his forward and uncompromising teaching style, his emphasis on narrative over visual beauty, and his commitment to film education. Sobociński was awarded several prizes; he also co-produced a number of notable movies. Just over a week before his death, he was awarded the Lifetime Achievement Award at the prestigious Camerimage film festival.

His son Piotr Sobociński (1958 – 2001) was also a cinematographer.

Selected filmography
 The Adventures of Gerard (1970)
 Family Life (Życie rodzinne; 1971)
 The Wedding (Wesele; 1972)
 The Hourglass Sanatorium (Sanatorium pod klepsydrą; 1973)
 The Promised Land (Ziemia obiecana; 1975)
 O-Bi, O-Ba: The End of Civilization (O-bi, o-ba: Koniec cywilizacji; 1985)
 Pirates (1986)
 Frantic (1988)
 Torrents of Spring (1989)
 The Gateway of Europe (Wrota Europy; 1999)

References

External links

Witold Sobociński profile at the Internet Encyclopedia of Cinematographers
10 Most Important Movies of Witold Sobociński

1929 births
2018 deaths
Melomani members
People from Ozorków
Polish cinematographers